Hedydipna  is a genus of sunbirds. It contains the following species, which are sometimes included in genus Anthreptes. 

The name Hedydipna comes from the Greek hēdudeipnos, meaning "dainty-supping" or "sweet-eating" — a reference to the nectar sipping habits of these species. These sunbirds are largely restricted to Africa and western islands in the Indian Ocean, though the Nile Valley sunbird is found as far east as Yemen.

References

 
Bird genera